Moorat is a TV serial, the English title is Eunuch's Wedding which premiered on ARY Digital. The serial is directed by Kamran Qureshi, written by Seema Ghazal and produced by Humayun Saeed & Abdullah Kadwani's production house 7th Sky Entertainment.
The story of a boy who was always snubbed and beaten by his brother and father and tried finding love outside the home.

Eunuch's Wedding dubbed as a taboo subject of 'eunuchs' who suffer endlessly in silence wrapped in slurs and miseries. A sensitive story that unfolds their deprived and isolated world and yet portrays eloquently how they too are not far away from the human emotions and feelings and their world not much different to ours.

Cast

Main
 Abid Ali as Eunuch Reshma
 Maria Wasti as Kosar
 Kashif Mehmood as Eunuch Babra
 Asad Malik as Police Officer Majeed
 Deeba as Sughra
 Munawar Saeed as Karim
 Mehmood Akhtar as Eunuch Shola
 Ehtasham Warsi as Eunuch Bijli
 Rashid Farooqui as Eunuch Chamki
 Adnan Jilani as Asim
 Sundus Shah as Young Kosar
 Ammar Shah as Young Babar
 Fawad Shah as Young Asim

Supporting
 Tamanna Begum as Kinza's mother
 Kinza as Asim's Wife
 Qaiser Naqvi as Bitto Khala
 Parveen Akbar as Hameeda
 Tahira Wasti as Mother of Eunuch Reshma
 Gaysoo as Kosar's Friends

Guest stars
 Raju Jamil as Father of Eunuch Reshma
 Akbar Subhani as Karamat
 Ashraf Khan as Achan Meyan
 Hareem Qureshi as Eunuch's daughter

Plot
Babar is the younger son of housewife Sughra and shopkeeper Kareem. When he is young, his mother constantly saves him from his father's beating and verbal abuse and brother's rude behavior in response to Babar's flamboyant behavior. Growing up, Babar likes all girlish things such as jewellery, cosmetics, shiny clothes, playing with dolls and going to eunuch Reshma's house who loves him and cares for him like a second mother. He grows up watching all this around him and starts spending more time with Reshma and her eunuch friends Bijli and Shola. He begins talking like a girl, goes to dancing events with eunuchs, which is their profession, in parties, weddings, etc.

Years later Babar's parents eventually decide to marry him with his cousin Kosar. He behaves in the same way with Kosar, praising her dress and jewellery. When Kosar sees him on their wedding night, she remembers that she has seem him as a eunuch in another wedding. The next morning when her mother comes, Kosar tells her and she takes Kosar back home. Kareem and Asim beat Babar and he leaves home, and goes and lives with Reshma.

Kosar visits Reshma's house and brings Babar back, thinking maybe she can change him. Later Kosar becomes pregnant and the same day Babar learns that Reshma has cancer and is in need of much money for her treatment. He leaves home and does not stop when Sughra and Kosar tries to stop him. Kosar leaves home and goes to her Aunt's home. She receives divorce papers from Babar. Later Kosar gives birth to a baby girl. Reshma dies of cancer and her parents come on her death.

Asim has already left home with his wife due to Babar. Kosar marries her aunt's son Majeed who is an honest police officer and likes Kosar. But he doesn't like Kosar's daughter. Sughra dies after being sick and mentally unbalanced.

More time progresses and Kosar eventually gives birth to a baby son and on the birth ceremony of baby, eunuchs come to their house to celebrate and perform. She watches Babar dancing with his mates. Kosar snatches the baby from Majeed when Babar is about to take the baby in his lap and pushes Babar who falls on the floor next to his daughter and there he discovers that the girl is his daughter. He tries to put his hand on the head of girl who moves away from Babar. Majeed then realizes what would have passed on Kosar and accepts the girl as a daughter.

Soundtrack
Main theme song Bewafa Zamanay me was composed by Waqar Ali and sung by Tina Sani. It was written by Mehmood Akhtar. Waris Shah's Punjabi poetry was used in second theme song, which was sung by Master Aslam. The music video was made with Tina Sani and slow versions of songs were used in key situations.

Awards and nominations
4th Lux Style Awards 
 Nominated - Best TV Serial (2005).
 Nominated - Best TV Actress (2005) - Maria Wasti.
 Nominated - Best TV Actor (2005) - Abid Ali. And
 Nominated - Best TV Director (2005) - Kamran Qureshi.

See also
 Sarkar Sahab
 Riyasat
 Makan
 Manzil
 Ishq Ki Inteha
 Choti Si Kahani

References

External links
 

 Director's Website
 Facebook Page
 ARY Official Website
 Maria Wasti on set of Moorat
 Adid Ali on set of Moorat
 Humayun Saeed & Kamran Qureshi's Interview
 Abdullah Kadwani's Interview
 Seema Ghazal's Interview
 Kashif Mehmood on set of Moorat
 Waqar Ali's Interview
 Tina Sani's Interview
 Munawar Saeed on set of Moorat
 Deeba on set of Moorat
 Mehmood Akhtar on set of Moorat
 M Warsi on set of Moorat
 Perveen Akbar on set of Moorat
 Adnan Jelani on set of Moorat
 Naeem Rizvi on set of Moorat

Pakistani drama television series
Urdu-language television shows
2000s Pakistani television series
2004 Pakistani television series debuts
2005 Pakistani television series endings
ARY Digital original programming
Pakistani LGBT-related television shows